Thomas Gedney Patten (September 12, 1861 – February 23, 1939) was an American lawyer and politician who served three terms as a U.S. Representative from New York from 1911 to 1917.

Biography
He was born in New York City on September 12, 1861. Patten attended Mount Pleasant Academy, Ossining, New York, then Columbia College, New York City from 1877 to 1879, and Columbia Law School in 1880–1882.

Career 
He engaged in the shipping business and subsequently operated a fleet of tugboats in New York Harbor.
He served as president of the New York & Long Branch Steamboat Co.

Congress 
Patten was elected as a Democrat to the Sixty-second, Sixty-third, and Sixty-fourth Congresses (March 4, 1911 – March 3, 1917).
He was an unsuccessful candidate for reelection in 1916 to the Sixty-fifth Congress.
He was the Postmaster of New York City from 1917 to 1921.

Later career and death 
He moved to Hollywood, California, in 1922 and served on the staff of the Motion Picture Producers and Distributors of America, Inc., until 1924 when he retired.

He died in Hollywood, California, February 23, 1939. He was interred in Forest Lawn Memorial Park, Los Angeles, California.

Reference and source

External links
 

1861 births
1939 deaths
Democratic Party members of the United States House of Representatives from New York (state)
Postmasters of New York City
Columbia College (New York) alumni
Columbia Law School alumni